Reynoldston is a rural village and a community in the City and County of Swansea, Wales, which had a population of 439 in 2011. The community has its own elected community council. The village is located deep in the heart of the Gower Peninsula.

It has one of the longest functioning community broadband schemes in the UK, which has started in 2003, and has continued despite the availability of ADSL.

Reynoldston commemorates the new millennium with 'The Millennium Stone' which can be found on the village green, just underneath a tree.

References

External links
The Reynoldston Village Community web site
Reynoldston on GowerCoast.com

Villages in Swansea
Populated places on the Gower Peninsula
Communities in Swansea